Peachtree is a community located in Cherokee County, North Carolina. It is named after the numerous peach trees found in the area. The local schools are Peachtree Elementary School, Murphy and Andrews Middle School, and Murphy and Andrews High School.

References

Populated places in Cherokee County, North Carolina